Dominic Boland (born 25 September 1997) is a Scottish footballer who plays as a defender.

References

External links
 
 Profile at Upper Iowa Athletics
 Profile at Limestone College Athletics

1997 births
Living people
Greenville Triumph SC players
USL League One players
Scottish footballers
Association football defenders
Scottish expatriate sportspeople in the United States
Scottish expatriate footballers